The following is a list of transfers for the 2013 Major League Soccer season.  Vancouver Whitecaps FC made the first move by dealing Dane Richards to Football League side Burnley during the 2012 season, but the transfer did not take effect until January 1, 2013. The rest of the moves will be made from the 2012–2013 off-season all the way through the roster freeze in September 2013.

Transfers 

 Player officially joined his new club on January 1, 2013.
 Only rights to player were acquired.

References

External links 
 Official Site of Major League Soccer

2013

M
M